In category theory, a branch of mathematics, a presheaf on a category  is a functor . If  is the poset of open sets in a topological space, interpreted as a category, then one recovers the usual notion of presheaf on a topological space.

A morphism of presheaves is defined to be a natural transformation of functors. This makes the collection of all presheaves on  into a category, and is an example of a functor category. A functor into  is sometimes called a profunctor.

A presheaf that is naturally isomorphic to the contravariant hom-functor Hom(–, A) for some object A of C is called a representable presheaf.

Some authors refer to a functor  as a -valued presheaf.

Examples 
 A simplicial set is a Set-valued presheaf on the simplex category .

Properties 
 When  is a small category, the functor category  is cartesian closed.
These are the universal and existential quantifiers.
 A locally small category  embeds fully and faithfully into the category  of set-valued presheaves via the Yoneda embedding which to every object  of  associates the hom functor .
The category  admits small limits and small colimits. See limit and colimit of presheaves for further discussion.

Universal property 
The construction  is called the colimit completion of C because of the following universal property:

Proof: Given a presheaf F, by the density theorem, we can write  where  are objects in C. Then let  which exists by assumption. Since  is functorial, this determines the functor . Succinctly,  is the left Kan extension of  along y; hence, the name "Yoneda extension". To see  commutes with small colimits, we show  is a left-adjoint (to some functor). Define  to be the functor given by: for each object M in D and each object U in C,

Then, for each object M in D, since  by the Yoneda lemma, we have:

The proposition yields several corollaries. For example, the proposition implies that the construction  is functorial: i.e., each functor  determines the functor .

Variants 
A presheaf of spaces on an ∞-category C is a contravariant functor from C to the ∞-category of spaces (for example, the nerve of the category of CW-complexes.) It is an ∞-category version of a presheaf of sets, as a "set" is replaced by a "space". The notion is used, among other things, in the ∞-category formulation of Yoneda's lemma that says:  is fully faithful (here C can be just a simplicial set.)

See also   
 Topos
 Category of elements
 Simplicial presheaf (this notion is obtained by replacing "set" with "simplicial set")
 Presheaf with transfers

Notes

References

Further reading 

Daniel Dugger, Sheaves and Homotopy Theory, the pdf file provided by nlab.

Functors
Sheaf theory
Topos theory